The Darjah Yang Amat Mulia Bintang Kenyalang Sarawak (Order of the Star of Hornbill Sarawak) is the second highest order group (in the group of orders) of the orders, decorations, and medals of Sarawak. The order was instituted in 1970, and was redesigned in 1988. Two more ranks were added to the order: the 'Officer' in 1988 and the 'Companion' in 2002.

The order is divided into six classes:

Nomination criteria

Panglima Gemilang Bintang Kenyalang (P.G.B.K.) 
Especially designated for men and women who rendered excellent service to the State of Sarawak for a long period of time and has strong influence with the highest display of responsibility befitting their station.

Johan Bintang Kenyalang (J.B.K.) 
Bestowed to men and women with high standing and provided an honourable service to the State of Sarawak in their respective fields. In order to qualify, the nominees display a strong influence in the field they are active in, and where it is exercised for the good of all. Within the civil service, those who are at Premiere Grade "C" or Special Grade "C" or those in the Top Management Group (Kumpulan Pengurusan Tertinggi) or its equivalent.

Pegawai Bintang Kenyalang (P.B.K.) 
An award for those with high position in their service to the State of Sarawak where although it may not be as outstanding as required for the second grade, but may be deemed as special, for instance the discharge of a special function or responsibility successfully over a span of several years. Those in the Civil Service's Professional and Management Group or higher, including the Assistant Commissioner of Police, Colonel in the Army, Captain in the Air Force, and Captain in the Navy, qualify to be nominated.

Ahli Bintang Kenyalang (A.B.K.) 
For service and contribution of high esteem suitable with their position or roles. Nominees from the Civil Service belong to the Support Group or higher, including Assistant Superintendent of Police, Major in the Army, Squadron Leader in the Air Force, and Lieutenant Commander in the Navy.

List of recipients

Datuk Patinggi Bintang Kenyalang (D.P.) 
Bestows upon its recipients the title Datuk Patinggi. Wives of the award holder are styled Datin Patinggi while husbands do not receive a courtesy title.
 Datuk Patinggi Hussein Onn, Prime Minister of Malaysia 
 Datuk Patinggi Mahathir Mohamad, Prime Minister of Malaysia - 1980
 Datuk Patinggi Tan Sri Abdul Rahman Ya'kub, Chief Minister of Sarawak and State Assembly Member (ADUN) for Kuala Rajang
 Datuk Patinggi Tan Sri Abdul Taib Mahmud, Chief Minister of Sarawak and State Assembly Member (ADUN) for Balingian 
 Datuk Patinggi Tan Sri Alfred Jabu anak Numpang, Deputy Chief Minister of Sarawak and State Assembly Member (ADUN) for Layar - 2004
 Datuk Patinggi Tan Sri George Chan Hong Nam, Deputy Chief Minister of Sarawak and State Assembly Member (ADUN) for Piasau - 2005
 His Royal Highness The Tunku Ibrahim Ismail Sultan Iskandar, Tunku Mahkota Johor - 2009
 The Late Puan Sri Datuk Patinggi Laila Taib, late wife of the Chief Minister of Sarawak - 2009
 Datuk Patinggi Tan Sri Muhyiddin Yassin, Deputy Prime Minister of Malaysia - 2014
 Datuk Patinggi Tan Sri Adenan Haji Satem, Fifth Chief Minister of Sarawak - 2014
 Toh Puan Datuk Patinggi Ragad Kurdi Taib, Spouse of the Yang di-Pertua Negeri Sarawak - 2015
 Datuk Patinggi Ahmad Zahid Hamidi, Deputy Prime Minister of Malaysia - 2016
 Datuk Patinggi Abang Johari Tun Abang Haji Openg, Sixth Chief Minister of Sarawak - 2017
 Datuk Patinggi Tan Sri Leonardus Benyamin Moerdani, Commander of the Indonesian National Armed Forces - 1986
 Datuk Patinggi Ismail Sabri Yaakob, Prime Minister of Malaysia - 2022

Datuk Amar Bintang Kenyalang (D.A.) 
Bestows upon its recipients the title Datuk Amar. Wives of the award holder are styled Datin Amar, while the recipient's husbands do not receive a courtesy title.
 Tan Sri Datuk Amar Alfred Jabu anak Numpang, Deputy Chief Minister of Sarawak and Member of Sarawak State Legislative Assembly (ADUN) for Layar
 Datuk Patinggi Abang Johari Tun Abang Haji Openg
 Datuk Amar Mohamad Morshidi Abdul Ghani, Sarawak State Secretary - 2010
 Pehin Sri Adenan Haji Satem, Chairman, Sarawak Foundation - 2010
 Datin Paduka Seri Rosmah Mansor, Spouse of the Prime Minister of Malaysia - 2010
 Datuk Amar Mohamad Asfia Awang Nasar, Speaker of the Sarawak State Legislative Assembly - 2011
 Dato' Sri Douglas Uggah Embas, Deputy Chief Minister of Sarawak and Member of Sarawak State Legislative Assembly (ADUN) for Bukit Saban - 2013
 Tan Sri Datuk Amar Yaw Teck Seng, Founder & President, Samling Group - 2014
 Tun Md Raus Sharif, President of the Court of Appeal - 2016
 Datuk Amar Jamilah Anu, wife of the Datuk Patinggi Tan Sri Adenan Haji Satem, Chief Minister of Sarawak - 2016
 Datin Patinggi Dato Juma'ani Tuanku Haji Bujang, Spouse of YAB Datuk Patinggi Abang Abdul Rahman Zohari Tun Abang Haji Openg, Chief Minister of Sarawak - 2018
The late Datuk Amar Alli Kawi, Former Deputy Commissioner of Police of Sarawak and Sarawak Police Special Branch Chief - 2018 (Posthumous)
The Late Datuk Amar Tan Sri Sim Kheng Hong, Former Deputy Chief Minister of Sarawak Cum Finance Minister.

Panglima Gemilang Bintang Kenyalang (P.G.B.K.) 
Bestows upon its recipients the title Datuk. Wives of the recipient are styled Datin, whereas their husbands do not have a courtesy title.
 Tan Sri Datuk Yaw Teck Seng, Founder, Samling Group - 1990
 Tan Sri Dato' Sri Peter Chin Fah Kui - 1998
 Datuk Mohammad Tufail Mahmud - 2004
 Datuk Zainal Abdin Ahmad - 2004
 Datuk Bolhassan Di, Sarawak Assistant Minister of Communication and Infrastructure Development - 2009
Datuk Hamden Ahmad, Sarawak Assistant Minister of Tourism and Urban Development - 2009
Rt. Rev'd. Datuk Bolly Lapok, Lord Bishop of the Diocese of Kuching - 2009
 Profesor Datuk Dr. Khairuddin Ab Hamid, Naib Canselor Universiti Malaysia Sarawak (UNIMAS) - 2010
 Datuk Haji Fadillah Haji Yusof, Deputy Minister of Science, Technology, and Innovation Malaysia and Member of Parliament (MP) for Petrajaya - 2010
 Datuk Dr Abang Haji Abdul Rauf Abang Haji Zen, Assistant Minister of Industrial Development - 2010
 Datuk Hajah Fatimah Abdullah - 2011
 Datuk Sylvester Entri Muran - 2011
 Datuk Mohd Naroden Majais - 2011
 Datuk Mong Dagang - 2011
 Datuk Abdul Wahab Aziz - 2011
 Datuk Roland Sagah Wee Inn - 2011
 Major General Datuk Mazelan Kasap - 2011
 Brigadier General Datuk Stephen Mundaw - 2011
 Datuk Temenggong Kanang Langkau - 2011
 Datuk Ling Suk Kiong, Deputy Chairman, Dayang Enterprise Holdings Berhad - 2014
 Datuk Hajah Nancy Shukri, Minister in the Prime Minister's Department and Member of Parliament for Batang Sadong - 2016
 Datuk Snowdan Lawan, Sarawak Assistant Minister of Youth and Sports and State Assembly Member for Balai Ringin - 2017
 Datuk Talat Mahmood Abdul Rashid, State Attorney General - 2017
 Professor Datuk Dr Mohamad Kadim Suadi, Vice Chancellor, Universiti Malaysia Sarawak (UNIMAS) - 2017
 Datuk Abdul Ajis Abdul Majeed, former State Assembly Member for Balingian - 2017
 Professor Datuk Dr. Awang Bulgiba Awang Mahmud, Deputy Vice Chancellor, Universiti Malaya (UM) - 2017
Datuk Robert Lawson Chuat, Member of Parliament for P.204 Betong - 2018
Datuk Dr Abdul Rahman Junaidi, Assembly Member for Pantai Damai - 2018
Dato Abdullah Abdul Rahim, former Sarawak Timber Industry Development Corporation (STIDC) General Manager - 2018
Datuk Hii Teck Yun, President of the Federation of Miri Division Chinese Associations - 2018

Johan Bintang Kenyalang (J.B.K.) 
 Datuk Dr Ahmad Ridzwan Arshad - 2004
 Kasjoo Kadis - 2004
 Lim Kian Hock - 2004
 Datin Napsiah Mahfoz - 2004
 Prof Dr. Khairuddin Abdul Hamid - 2004
 Francis Johen Adam, Acting Deputy State Attorney General - 2009
 Ubaidillah Abdul Latip, Permanent Secretary, State Ministry of Public Utilities - 2009
 Prof Helmut Lueckenhausen - 2011
 Pandalela Rinong, National Diver & Olympic Medalist - 2012
 Izyan Alirahman, also known as Zee Avi, musician - 2012
 Mohd Hafiz Mohd Suip, recording artist - 2012
 Jerry Kamit, sape player - 2012
 Muhamad Haneef Ali - 2016

Pegawai Bintang Kenyalang (P.B.K.) 

1. Syed Mohamad Fauzi Shahab

2. Matthew Chin Hiong Choi

3. Saniah Abdul Kadir

4. Ivy Lim Chen Chen

5. Sapiah Daud

6. John Awan

7. Abg Borhanudin Abg Ahmad Masuine

8. Ahmad Sukarno Saini

9. Happysupina Sait

10. Mohizah Mohamad

11. Rusmaliza Mat Darus

12. Siti Nirainawati Aini

13. Wisil Lichok

14. Jamey Mijek

15. Noor Salmah Reduan

16. Christopher Danan Binjie

17. Abang Jamallidon Abang Ullie

18. Enting @ Inting Nyami

19. Abg Mohamed Abg Turkey

20. Sebi Abang

21. Abdul Khalid Manap

22. Lim Hock Meng

23. Suhaili Mohamed

24. Elsie William

25. Jamalie Busri

26. Alfred Geling Ason

27. Andrew Gumbak

28. Engkamat Lading

29. Dr Cheong Yaw Liang

30. Timothy Alexander

31. LT. Kolonel Zainal Azli Ismail

32. Dayang Rahanah Awang Mashor

33. Law Poh Kiong

34. Rawa Nau

35. Ali Suhaili

36. Fathi Mursidi

37. Dayang Rozana Abang Hassan

38. Bernard Sia Siew Fang

39. Mohd Syafiq Anas Abdullah

40. Ismail Ibrahim

41. Philip Sangkan

42. Alexson Naga Chabu

43. Roselina Daud

44. Zulfikar Mohd Ghazali

45. Leftenan Kolonel Hanable Sunday Edward

46. Azlan Ramli

47. Dr Firdaus Abdullah @ Kenneth Kevin Akeu

48. Abdul Malik Abdullah @ Hin Langit

49 Sikin  Sentok

50. Joel @ Berinau Bangin

51. Japri Bujang Masli

52. Louis Simon Peter

53. Gabriel Bain Gonyep

54. Alli Matsah

55. Ghani Abone @ Marnie Abon

56. Roshidi Junai

57. Lau Oi Phen

58. Lau Hieng Wuong

59. Thomas Jawa Lasu

60. Peter @ Peter Lai Sakul

61. Haminah Tan

62. Durie Augustine Tinggie

63. Nicholas Amin

64. Kuek Eng Mong

65. Datin Seri Baduyah Bujang

66. Sim Soon Tian

67. Hii Sieh Toh

68. Rasiah Ali @ Rosiah Ali

69. Henry Colin Belawing

70. Yeo Liew Yian

71. Margaret Philip Bedus

72. Iskandar Sharkawi

73. Han Hipeni

74. Jong Yee Kie

75. Chambai Lindong

76. Dajai Anggie

77. Guan @ Franklin Guang Juma

78. Horaira @ Horairah Hanapi

79. Jamaiyah Sulaiman

80. Jamilah Rakim

81. Jawan Nyaun

82. Jenny Jita Eyir

83. Juliana Usun Kalang

84. Natasha Nasa Douglas Uggah

85. Rosita Poni

86. Thomas Lamit Lutik

87. Alyik Manding

88. Florince Christy

89. Hillary Mawan Antar

90. James Mering Imang

91. Kayak @ Philip Brandah

92. Kiew Shyn Yong

93. Musin Radin

94. Nang Balai

95. Stephen Ang Teck Chai

96. Theresa Gelang Dinggin

97. Lee Siang Hua

98. Loh Ling Tai

99. Wong Tiong Kee

100. Alexander Donald

101. Augustine Anjat Beti

Ahli Bintang Kenyalang (A.B.K.)

Notable recipients
The late PW (1) Temenggong Kanang Anak Langkau, SP, PGB, then awarded with the "Commander" which carries the title "Datuk" in 2011.
Pandelela Rinong became the youngest Sarawakian to receive the order when she was awarded the "Companion" order in a special investiture ceremony to commemorate her achievement in the 2012 London Olympics.
Izyan Alirahman, also known by her stage name Zee Avi, was conferred the "Officer" order in an investiture ceremony on 12 December 2012 alongside Mohd Hafiz Mohd Suip, also a singer-songwriter, and renowned sape player Jerry Kamit.

External links
 Photos of the Sarawak State Orders,Decorations and Medals  (Public Relations and Corporate Affairs Unit, Sarawak Chief Minister's Department)

References

Star of Hornbill Sarawak